Curriehill is a suburb of Edinburgh, the capital of Scotland. It is north-west of Currie.

Curriehill railway station is the western terminus of the Edinburgh Crossrail. These trains continue to Glasgow Central via West Lothian and North Lanarkshire.

References

External links 
Website about Curriehill

Areas of Edinburgh